Water & Garri is the second EP by Nigerian singer-songwriter Tiwa Savage. It was released on August 20, 2021, through Universal Music Group, Motown Records and Capitol Records. Similar to her previous project Celia (2020), the EP features a mix of different genres such as R&B, afrobeats, soul and pop and lyrically addresses the subject of love. It features guest vocals from Amaarae, Brandy, Nas, Rich King and Tay Iwar.

Background and promotion
Tiwa Savage announced the release of an EP, called Water & Garri, in April 2021. American rapper and record producer Pharrell Williams previewed and praised the project and described one of the tracks as "a classic". Savage held a private listening party at a plush hotel in Accra, Ghana. On August 16, 2021, Savage announced the EP's release date and revealed the cover artwork and tracklist. American singer Brandy (who is featured on the EP) acknowledged Savage's tracklist post and also thanked her for featuring her on the album via her Instagram story.

The lead single, "Tales by Moonlight" (featuring Amaarae), was released on August 19, 2021. "Somebody's Son" (featuring Brandy), which was initially released as a promotional single for Water & Garri on August 19, 2021, was released as the second single from the EP on October 13, 2021, along with its accompanying music video. The song was serviced to urban contemporary radio and it later peaked at number 19 on the US Adult R&B Songs chart and has spent 3 months there. Savage performed both "Tales by Moonlight" and "Somebody's Son" at the Global Citizen Festival on September 26, 2021.

Track listing

Release history

References

2021 EPs
Tiwa Savage albums
Universal Music Group EPs
Motown albums
Capitol Records EPs